Solomon "Solly" Hilton is a retired soccer forward who played professionally in the American Soccer League and American Indoor Soccer Association.

Career
Although a native of West Africa, Hilton attended high school in the United States.  In 1979, he signed with the New Jersey Americans of the American Soccer League in 1979.  In 1981, he played for New York United.  In 1982, he moved to the Pennsylvania Stoners.  Hilton was a member of the 1984 Houston Dynamos of the United Soccer League. Later in 1984, he joined the Columbus Capitals of the American Indoor Soccer Association.  In 1986, he moved to the Tampa Bay Rowdies for their one season in the AISA.

References

American Indoor Soccer Association players
American Soccer League (1933–1983) players
Columbus Capitals players
Houston Dynamos players
Miami Americans players
New Jersey Americans (ASL) players
New York Apollo players
New York United players
Pennsylvania Stoners players
Tampa Bay Rowdies (1975–1993) players
United Soccer League (1984–85) players
Living people
Association football forwards
American soccer players
Year of birth missing (living people)